The 29th Edition Vuelta a España (Tour of Spain), a long-distance bicycle stage race and one of the three grand tours, was held from 23 April to 12 May 1974. José Luis Albilleira won the mountains classification while Domingo Perurena won the points classification.

Teams and riders

Route

Results

Final General Classification

References

 
Vuelta a España
1974
Vuelta a España
Vuelta a España
Vuelta a España
1974 Super Prestige Pernod